The B&R rig is a variant of the Bermuda sailboat rig, designed and patented by Swedish aeronautical engineers Lars Bergström and Sven Ridder. It employs swept spreaders that are usually angled aft, together with "stays" running diagonally downward from the tip of the spreaders to the attachment of the next pair of spreaders to the mast or to the intersection of the mast with the deck (so-called reverse-diagonal shrouds) that facilitates a pre-bend of the mast (curving aft) that is sometimes tuned into the rig before it is stepped onto the boat. Conventional shrouds thereby contribute to both lateral and longitudinal stability, unlike rigs with unswept spreaders. A B&R rig can be a masthead or fractional rig depending on how stays are configured; a backstay is optional. Such rigs are employed in many of the models of at least one U.S. manufacturer and in many thousands of boats, worldwide.



History 
The earliest B&R rig was the result of wind tunnel tests and research by Lars Bergstrom and Sven Ridder at Sweden's Royal Institute of Technology.  The first generation, built around 1970, included a backstay and was used on many production boats. A patent application for the B&R rig was submitted in 1973 and was granted in 1975. A second generation eliminated the backstay but used solid, deck-mounted struts to brace the lower mast section.  In 1982 a second generation B&R rig with 2 forestays was incorporated into the  "breakthrough" racing yacht Thursday's Child. On February 13, 1989 Thursday's Child beat the 135 year old clipper ship record sailing  from New York to San Francisco. A third generation B&R rig mounted the mast on a tripod of struts, had a single forestay and no backstay. In 1993 the third generation was incorporated into the all carbon/kevlar  yacht Route 66. The  yacht Hunter's Child finished 2nd in the 1994-95 BOC Challenge using a second generation B&R rig. By 1997 more than 10,000 production sailboats were using the B&R rig.

Tuning 
Part of the design of the B&R rig involves inducing a "pre-bend" in the mast which provides some of the side-to-side and fore-and-aft stability of the rig. The pre-bend is achieved by tensioning the reverse diagonals and certain other so called intermediate shrouds. Because the spreaders are swept back at approximately a 25° to 30° angle, this tensioning bows the mast. Balanced and proper tensioning keeps the bow in the mast in the fore-aft direction and eliminates any curvature in the sideways direction. The pre-bend is generally set up on the ground before the mast is stepped (placed onto the boat). The mast is then stepped and all other standing rigging is attached to the boat and properly tensioned.

Boat and yacht models incorporating B&R rigs 
The majority of Hunter Marine's fleet incorporated the B&R rig. However, manufacturers on both sides of the Atlantic Ocean have employed B&R rigs in their boat designs.

References

External links 

 The yacht Route 66 home page.
Hunter Marine's video explaining the B&R Rig Design.

Sailing rigs and rigging